The Congressional Bike Caucus (CBC) is a bipartisan caucus of the United States House of Representatives launched by Representative Earl Blumenauer. It is officially registered with the Committee on House Administration, the house committee responsible for regulating caucuses. The caucus aims to promote cycling by improving infrastructure and increasing awareness of cyclists.  the caucus has 108 members. The current co-chairs of the caucus are Representatives Blumenauer and Vern Buchanan.

See also 
 Congressional Motorcycle Safety Caucus

References 

Caucuses of the United States Congress
Cycling organizations in the United States